A polar opposite is the diametrically opposite point of a circle or sphere. It is mathematically known as an antipodal point, or antipode when referring to the Earth. It is also an idiom often used to describe people and ideas that are opposites.

Polar Opposite or Polar Opposites may also refer to:
 Polar Opposite, a 2011 EP by Sick Puppies
 Polar Opposites, a 2000 album by Junior Pantherz
 "Polar Opposites", an episode of the television series The Wild Thornberrys
 "Polar Opposites", an episode of the television series Tanked
 Polar Opposites, a 2008 film written by Paolo Mazzucato and directed by Fred Olen Ray
 "Polar Opposites", a song by Modest Mouse from the album The Lonesome Crowded West

See also
 Polarization (disambiguation)
 Opposite (disambiguation)
 Apples and oranges, comparing two items or groups of items that cannot be practically compared